San Francesco delle Favete is a Roman Catholic church located in the old town of Apiro, province of Macerata, region of Marche, Italy.

History
Tradition holds that St Francis himself performed miracles at this 14th-century church. He was visiting the Benedictine monastery of Sant'Urbano dell’Esinante. They prompted him to build a convent and a church at the site. The convent was ruined over the ages. The site had a grotto used by Francis for prayer. The Romanesque and Gothic style stone church retains traces of frescoes from the late 15th century in the apse. A façade and nave wall collapsed during the 2016 earthquake.

References

Apiro
14th-century Roman Catholic church buildings in Italy
Romanesque architecture in le Marche
Gothic architecture in le Marche